is a Mongolian professional sumo wrestler from Ulaanbaatar. He made his debut in March 2015 and reached the top makuuchi division in January 2020. He wrestles for Michinoku stable. His highest rank has been sekiwake. He has one runner-up performance and two special prizes in his career to date.

Career
His father was a sheep-raising nomad in Dornod Province. From a young age, he rode horses to help his father at work, which strengthened his legs and waist – an advantage for sumo. In 2014, he was invited by an acquaintance along with four other Mongolians to Japan to try out sumo at Michinoku stable. He had judo experience but not sumo experience. At that time, he was over 180 cm tall, but weighed less than 70 kg. The Michinoku stablemaster, ex-ōzeki Kirishima, thought Byambachuluun was the best of the five, but was reluctant at first to take on a foreign recruit. The stable had not had a foreigner since Hakuba was forced to retire over match-fixing allegations in 2011. He eventually relented after Byambachuluun committed to staying in Japan, and let him take the new recruits examination in February 2015. After satisfying visa requirements, he made his dohyō debut in May 2015. Despite his lack of sumo experience he looked good in sumo school against future top division wrestlers such as Hokutofuji and Ura. 

He took four years from his professional debut to reach the sekitori ranks, hindered by a serious knee injury in May 2016, but was eventually promoted in March 2019. He was the first new sekitori Michinoku stable had produced since Kirinowaka in January 2008. He moved through the jūryō division in just five tournaments.  His fellow Mongolian, yokozuna Kakuryū, became his stablemate in October 2019 when Izutsu stable closed. He took part in a four-way playoff for the jūryō championship or yūshō in November 2019, his 11–4 record securing his promotion. In his debut top makuuchi division tournament in January 2020 he won the Fighting Spirit Prize with an 11–4 record. In March he stood at only four wins against six losses after Day 10, but won his last five matches to secure a 9–6 record and promotion to a new highest rank of maegashira 3 for the next tournament, which was originally scheduled for May but actually took place in July. He withdrew on Day 10 of the September 2020 tournament with a shoulder injury,  but returned from Day 13 to secure a winning record of 9–4–2.

Kiribayama was promoted to his highest rank to date of komusubi for the November 2021 tournament, the first Mongolian to debut in sanyaku since Tamawashi and Terunofuji in March 2015. He managed only six wins against nine losses in this tournament, and returned to the  ranks. He was promoted to komusubi again following the July 2022 tournament, and maintained his rank for the next three tournaments. in January 2023 he was runner-up with an 11–4 record and was awarded his first Technique Prize.

Fighting style
According to his Japan Sumo Association profile, Kiribayama's preferred grip on his opponent's mawashi is hidari-yotsu, a right arm outside and left hand inside position. His favourite techniques are listed as yori-kiri (force out) and nage (throws), both underarm and overarm. In the run-up to his top division promotion he increased his weight by 10kg to 140kg, giving him a more powerful attack, but he is still able to outmaneuver his opponents by his speed and footwork.

Career record

See also
List of sekiwake
List of active sumo wrestlers
Active special prize winners
List of sumo tournament top division runners-up
Glossary of sumo terms

References

External links
 

1996 births
Living people
Mongolian sumo wrestlers
Sportspeople from Ulaanbaatar
Sekiwake